EchoStar I is a communications satellite operated by EchoStar. Launched in 1995, it was operated in geostationary orbit at a longitude of 77 degrees west for 12 or 15 years. The company has approved the transfer of the 77 degree west orbital position to QuetzSat as of September 22, 2010.

Satellite 
The launch of EchoStar made use of a Long March rocket flying from Xichang Satellite Launch Center in Sichuan province of the People's Republic of China. The launch took place at 11:50 UTC on December 28, 1995, with the spacecraft entering a geosynchronous transfer orbit. The spacecraft carried 16 Ku band transponders to enable direct broadcast communications and television channels through  dishes on the ground in the American continents.

Specifications 
 Launch mass: 
 Power source: 2 deployable solar arrays, batteries
 Stabilization: 3-axis
 Propulsion: 2 × LEROS-1B
 Telemetry in the C band: 4.1986 & 4.1996 GHz
 Command: 5.926 & 6.423 GHz

See also

 1995 in spaceflight

References

Spacecraft launched in 1995
Communications satellites in geostationary orbit
E01